The New Zealand Under-19 cricket team have been playing official Under-19 test matches since 1986. Former captains of the team include Stephen Fleming, Craig McMillan, Chris Cairns, Brendon McCullum, and Ross Taylor 

New Zealand's coach for the 2020 Under-19 Cricket World Cup is Paul Wiseman. Previous coaches have included Robert Carter (appointed 2014) and Mark Greatbatch (appointed 2001).

New Zealand's best World Cup result occurred at the 1998 event in South Africa, where they lost to England in the final by seven wickets.

Under-19 World Cup record

References

 Under-19 World Cup 2014 Squad

1986 establishments in New Zealand
Under-19 cricket teams
Cricket clubs established in 1986
C
New Zealand in international cricket